Hamilton Township Schoolhouse No. 4, also known as the Brady House, is a historic school building located at Hamilton Township, Delaware County, Indiana. It was built in 1897, and is a -story, three bay, brick building with a gable roof.  It rests on a raised stone foundation, has a square bell tower above the entrance, and two brick chimneys.  The school was abandoned in 1899 and converted to a residence between 1917 and 1919.

It was added to the National Register of Historic Places in 1984.

References

School buildings on the National Register of Historic Places in Indiana
School buildings completed in 1897
Buildings and structures in Delaware County, Indiana
National Register of Historic Places in Delaware County, Indiana